The Seattle Storm are an American professional basketball team based in Seattle. The Storm competes in the Women's National Basketball Association (WNBA) as a member club of the league's Western Conference. The team was founded by Ginger Ackerley and her husband Barry ahead of the 2000 season. The team is currently owned by Force 10 Hoops LLC, which is composed of three Seattle businesswomen: Dawn Trudeau, Lisa Brummel, and Ginny Gilder.

The Storm have qualified for the WNBA Playoffs in sixteen of its twenty-one years in Seattle. The franchise has been home to many high-quality players such as former UConn stars Sue Bird, Swin Cash, and Breanna Stewart; 2004 Finals MVP Betty Lennox; and Australian power forward Lauren Jackson, a three-time league MVP. The Storm are four-time WNBA Champions, with victories in 2004, 2010, 2018, and 2020. They are one of two teams who have never lost a WNBA Finals, the defunct Houston Comets being the other.

The team cultivates a fan-friendly, family environment at home games by having an all-kid dance squad, which leads young fans in a conga line on the court during time-outs, to the music of "C'mon N' Ride It (The Train)" by the Quad City DJ's. Named for the rainy weather of Seattle, the team uses many weather-related icons: the team mascot is Doppler, a maroon-furred creature with a cup anemometer on its head; the theme song for Storm home games is AC/DC's "Thunderstruck"; and its newsletter is called Stormwatch.

The Storm were the sister team of the Seattle SuperSonics of the NBA prior to February 28, 2008, when the team was sold to Force 10 Hoops LLC.

Franchise history

A gloomy start (2000–2001)
The Storm's predecessor was the Seattle Reign, a charter member of the American Basketball League (ABL), operating from 1996 through December 1998, when the league folded. Luckier than most localities that had an ABL team, Seattle was quickly awarded a WNBA franchise and began to play less than two years later.

The Seattle Storm would tip off their first season (the 2000 WNBA season) in typical expansion fashion. Coached by Lin Dunn and led by guard Edna Campbell and Czech center Kamila Vodichkova, the team finished with a 6–26 record. The low record, however, allowed the Storm to draft a 19-year-old Australian standout Lauren Jackson. Though Seattle did not make the playoffs in the 2001 season, Jackson's impressive rookie performance provided a solid foundation for the franchise to build on.

Sue Bird's arrival and the road to the WNBA Finals (2002–2004)

In the 2002 draft, the Storm drafted UConn star Sue Bird, filling the Storm's gap at the point guard position. With Bird's playmaking ability and Jackson's scoring and rebounding, the team made the playoffs for the first time in 2002 but were swept by the Los Angeles Sparks.

Coach Anne Donovan was hired for the 2003 campaign. In Donovan's first year, Jackson would win the WNBA Most Valuable Player Award, but the team had a disappointing season (with Bird injured for much of the year), and the Storm missed the playoffs.

The 2004 Storm posted a then franchise-best 20–14 record. In the playoffs, the Storm made quick work of the Minnesota Lynx, sweeping them in the first round. The Storm then squared off against an up-and-coming Sacramento Monarchs team in the West Finals. The Storm would emerge victorious, winning the series 2–1. In the WNBA Finals, the Storm would finish off the season as champions, defeating the Connecticut Sun 2 games to 1. Betty Lennox was named MVP of the Finals. The win made Anne Donovan the first female head coach in WNBA history to win the WNBA Championship.

A consistent postseason contender (2005–2009)
Key players from the Storm's championship season were not on the team in 2005. Vodichkova, Tully Bevilaqua, and Sheri Sam moved on to other teams. Also, the pre-season injury of Australian star and new acquisition Jessica Bibby hampered the team's 2005 season. While they matched their 2004 record and made the playoffs, the Storm's title defense was stopped in the first round by the Houston Comets, 2 games to 1.

In 2006, the Storm would finish 18–16, good enough to make the playoffs. The Storm put up a good fight in the first round against the Sparks but would fall short 2–1. In 2007, the Storm would finish .500 (17–17), good enough to make the playoffs in a weak Western Conference. The Storm would be quickly swept out of the playoffs by the Phoenix Mercury.

On November 30, 2007, Anne Donovan resigned as head coach, and was replaced by Brian Agler on January 9, 2008.

Although most of Seattle's major sports teams endured poor seasons during 2008, the Storm would be the only standout team in Seattle that year, posting a franchise-best 22–12 record and finishing with a 16–1 record at home, also a franchise-best. But the No. 2 seeded Storm lost to the #3 Los Angeles Sparks in the first round of the playoffs in three games and ended Seattle's season at 23–14 overall.

In 2009, the Storm were 20–14 and finished second in the Western Conference for the second straight year. In the playoffs, the Storm again lost to the #3 Los Angeles Sparks in 3 games, which ended their season in the first round for the fifth consecutive season.

A second championship (2010)
In the 2010 season, the Storm was almost unstoppable with a record-tying 28 wins and 6 losses in the regular season, including a perfect 17–0 at KeyArena. This was the most home wins in the history of the WNBA.

Along the way, Lauren Jackson was named WNBA Western Conference Player of the Week five times, and Western Conference Player of the Month three times, on her way to being named WNBA MVP for the third time. Agler was also named Coach of the Year.

In the playoffs, the Storm dramatically reversed their fortunes from the previous five seasons. They started with a sweep of the Sparks, the team that previously knocked them out of the playoffs every time they met. Then they swept Diana Taurasi and the Phoenix Mercury in the conference finals, and the Atlanta Dream in the WNBA Finals. With two league championships, the Storm became Seattle's most successful pro sports team by that measure.

Postseason pains (2011–2014)
With the same lineup as the previous year, the Storm had much expectation for the 2011 WNBA season. But right in the second round a two-year home invincibility was broken by the Minnesota Lynx, who even left the Storm scoreless for the first seven minutes. Injuries hit multiple players, especially Lauren Jackson, who had to undergo hip surgery and missed most of the season. The regular starting five resumed play only in the last five games, but Sue Bird and Swin Cash kept the Storm competitive, finishing second in the WNBA with 21 wins and 13 losses. On the playoffs, a Mercury buzzer beater at the KeyArena eliminated the Storm in round 1.

In 2012, with Jackson absent for the early season training with the Australia national team and injuries to most of the team, including Bird, only Camille Little and Katie Smith played on all the games of the regular season. Upon her return, Jackson missed some games due to a hamstring injury but reached 6,000 points on her WNBA career playing against the San Antonio Silver Stars. The 16-18 record put the Storm fourth in the West, facing the Lynx, who posted the league's best record during the regular season, in the playoffs. While the Storm managed to force a game 3 by winning in the KeyArena at double overtime, a last-second attempt by Jackson went off the rim and the Lynx took the series-winning by just one point, 73-72.

After losing in the first round of the 2013 playoffs to the Lynx following a .500 regular season, the Storm missed the playoffs in 2014. This was the first time the Storm missed the playoffs since 2003.

Loyd/Stewart Era, third and fourth championships (2015–2022)
Following seven-year head coach & GM Brian Agler's hiring in Los Angeles, the Storm elevated President Alisha Valavanis to President & GM, and two weeks later, hired Jenny Boucek as the fourth head coach in franchise history. Valavanis and Boucek promptly got to work, trading Shekinna Stricklen and Camille Little to the Connecticut Sun for the #3 and #15 2015 WNBA draft picks, along with Renee Montgomery. Storm free agent Tanisha Wright signed with the New York Liberty, and a month later, Valavanis shipped the #15 pick to the Mystics for Quanitra Hollingsworth and the #20 pick in the 2015 WNBA Draft. Valavanis also signed Australian forward Abby Bishop that month.

Fast forward to April 2015, the month of the WNBA Draft, where Seattle now held the #1, #3, #20 and #26 picks. Days before the draft, Notre Dame guard Jewell Loyd and Minnesota center Amanda Zahui B. shook up the draft order, both forgoing NCAA eligibility and declaring for the WNBA Draft. On April 16, 2015, Seattle drafted Jewell Loyd #1, UCONN sharpshooter Kaleena Mosqueda-Lewis #3, Vicky McIntyre #20 and Nneka Enemkpali #26 in the 2015 WNBA Draft. In the 2015 WNBA season, despite missing out on the playoffs with a 10-24 record, the number-one drafted Jewell Loyd would win the Rookie of the Year Award.

After having the worst record in the WNBA, the Storm ended up with the first overall pick again using it to select Breanna Stewart from the University of Connecticut. In the 2016 WNBA season, Stewart immediately emerged as one of the young rising stars in the league, winning Rookie of the Year, averaged an impressive 18.9 ppg and broke the record for most defensive rebounds in a regular season. Loyd would statistically improve, averaging 16.5 ppg, birthing a new, young dynamic tandem as the "Next Great Storm Duo" after Sue Bird and Lauren Jackson. This would lead the Storm back into playoff contention as they finished as the 6th seed with a 16-18 record under the league's new playoff format, but would lose to the Atlanta Dream in the first round elimination game.

In the 2017 season, both Loyd and Stewart continued to get better and lead the Storm into playoff contention. Loyd averaged 17.7 ppg and Stewart 19.9 ppg. Stewart would become an all-star for the first time in her career and was one of two all-stars representing the Storm in the 2017 WNBA All-Star Game along with Sue Bird. The Storm finished as the 8th seed with a 15-19 record but would lose yet again in the first round elimination game by the Phoenix Mercury.

In the 2018 season, the Storm would elevate from a mediocre playoff team to a title contender. In the offseason, they made some slight changes to the roster. They traded for Natasha Howard and drafted Jordin Canada. Bird, Loyd, and Stewart were all voted into the 2018 WNBA All-Star Game, creating a "big three" on the Storm's roster. Bird also broke records in 2018 by becoming the franchise leader in scoring and the league's all-time regular-season assists leader. With Bird's leadership and the continued development of Loyd and Stewart, the Storm finished 26-8 with the number 1 seed headed into the WNBA Playoffs. They would receive a double-bye to the semi-finals. Stewart who averaged 20.0 ppg and 8.8 RPG won the 2018 Most Valuable Player award. They faced the Phoenix Mercury in the semi-finals where Stewart averaged 24.0 ppg and Loyd added 11.0 ppg. They would defeat the Mercury in a hard-fought five-game series, advancing to the WNBA Finals for the first time since 2010. In the Finals, the Storm would sweep their opponent, the Washington Mystics, winning their first championship in eight years, Stewart was named Finals MVP.

Even before the season started, 2019 was a year defined by health issues for the Storm. On April 15, Stewart ruptured her Achilles tendon playing in a Euroleague game for Dynamo Kursk when she collided with Brittney Griner, putting her out for the entire 2019 season. Four days later, head coach Dan Hughes was diagnosed with a cancerous tumor in his colon; he had it removed in May and missed the entire season, with assistant Gary Kloppenburg taking over in an interim role Later that month, after the Storm finished their preseason schedule, it was announced that Bird would have to undergo knee surgery, sidelining her too for the year.

With Bird out, Canada stepped into the starting point guard role, finishing 2019 third in the WNBA in assists per game (5.5) and second in steals per game (2.3). Meanwhile, without Stewart and with Loyd missing seven games with an injury of her own, Howard became the focal point of the Seattle offense, scoring a career-high 18.1 points per game. The shorthanded Storm finished the season 18-16, earning the No. 6 seed in the 2019 WNBA playoffs. Seattle won its first-round matchup against the Minnesota Lynx, 84-74, and then lost in the second round to the Los Angeles Sparks, 92-69.

The 2020 WNBA season was atypical, played entirely inside Bradenton, Florida's IMG Academy, dubbed the "wubble," the WNBA's version of the NBA's Bubble. The Storm entered the wubble with Bird and Stewart back, but without head coach Dan Hughes, whose cancer diagnosis made him a health risk. Bird missed several games with a left knee bone bruise, but came back for the playoffs, in which the Storm didn't lose a single game. The Storm closed out the top-ranked Las Vegas Aces in three games en route to their fourth championship, with Stewart again named Finals MVP. The Storm remained at Angel of the Winds Arena in Everett for the 2021 season with limited capacity due to COVID guidelines.

The Storm moved to their new home at Climate Pledge Arena for the 2022 season and played their regular season game there on May 6, 2022. Sue Bird announced that she would retire at the end of the season and drew a franchise record crowd of 18,100 spectators for her last regular season game.

Name, logo and team colors

The Storm's name was chosen because of Seattle's reputation as a rainy city, as well as the aggressive nature implicit in the name. Though the team conducted an exhaustive trademark search for options, Storm was always their preferred choice. The name had once been trademarked by an amateur soccer club, FC Seattle Storm, in the mid-1980s, but by 2000 it was free for the WNBA to take ownership. The team had planned a formal announcement, along with a presentation of the logo and official team colors, at a January 2000 gala event for the inaugural season ticket holders. However, a Miami newspaper revealed the name two weeks early while announcing all four of that season's expansion franchises.

Logo
The original logo featured a rounded, stylized silhouette of the Space Needle, an iconic Seattle landmark, set against the backdrop of a green storm cloud. In dynamic font and fashion, the team name stretches in an angled rise from left to right. Pointed jags meant to evoke lightning bolts streak through the team name from right to left. A basketball orbits the Space Needle through the cloud.

In January 2016, the team revealed a branding update that eliminated the use of red. The team logos retained the same overall design, but used the simplified color scheme.

An alternate logo, which placed the S from the Storm wordmark on a green oval, was used on the team's jerseys on and off until 2020 in place of the more complicated primary mark.

In March 2021, the team released an entirely new logo and updated color scheme. The Space Needle, depicted in a new, more minimalist style, is interlinked with the ribs of a basketball and incorporates a small lightning bolt into the tower. The logo has a pointed shape, meant to evoke Mount Rainier. A sleeker modern font and the new color scheme of dark green, yellow, and bright green are used.

Team colors
Like several early WNBA teams, the Storm was owned by their NBA counterpart, the Seattle SuperSonics, and closely related to the team. Taking their cue from the Sonics' team colors at the time, known colloquially as the "wine and pine" era of the team, the Storm's original team colors were pine green, maroon red, bronze, and white. When a new ownership group led by Starbucks CEO Howard Schultz purchased the Sonics and Storm in 2001, the NBA club returned to the traditional green-and-golden yellow color scheme that the team had used for its first 28 years of existence. The Storm, however, retained their colors as a way to uniquely market the team. Following another change of ownership in 2006, the team was then sold to Force 10 Hoops LLC in 2008 when the Oklahoma City interests that owned the Sonics announced intentions to relocate the NBA club to Oklahoma City as the Thunder. Force 10 also retained the original colors.

The January 2016 branding update changed the official team colors. Adopting a scheme similar to their former NBA brother team, the updated colors were thunder green, a less saturated shade than before, and lightning yellow. White and thunder gray featured as accent colors.

The new 2021 design keeps the 2016–2020 colors of lightning yellow and dark thunder green, and replaces gray with the bright bolt green.

Off-court activity

2006 and 2008 sales

Following disagreements between the Basketball Club of Seattle (the former owners of the Sonics and Storm) and the city of Seattle concerning the need to renovate the KeyArena, the Seattle SuperSonics and the Seattle Storm were sold to an Oklahoma City group led by Clay Bennett on July 18, 2006. Bennett made it clear that the Sonics and Storm would move to Oklahoma City at some point after the 2007–08 NBA season, unless an arena for the Sonics was approved by Seattle leaders before October 31, 2007. During this period of uncertainty, the Storm announced that they would play their 2008 WNBA season in Seattle at KeyArena.

On January 8, 2008, Bennett sold the team to a Seattle group of women called Force 10 Hoops, LLC. The sale was given unanimous approval from the WNBA Board of Governors on February 28, 2008. This kept the team in Seattle and disconnected it from the Sonics.  The Sonics moved to Oklahoma City in July, during the WNBA season.

Uniform sponsor
On April 21, 2010, the Storm and the WNBA announced a sponsor agreement with Bing, a search engine from Microsoft, to place the company's logo on their jerseys for the 2010 season. The Bing sponsorship ended after the 2013 season, and the Storm played without a sponsor for two seasons, before signing a new uniform deal with Swedish Medical Center for the 2016 season.

Championship ring for President
In June 2011, President of the United States Barack Obama invited the 2010 WNBA champion Seattle Storm to the White House. He stated that the franchise provided a good example for young girls with big dreams. He praised the Storm for the community service they perform and stated that being champions did not end when they step off the court. The Storm presented the President with a championship ring.

Temporary move to the University of Washington
With Climate Pledge Arena to be closed during its renovation into a venue suitable for the Seattle Kraken of the National Hockey League, the Storm were forced to seek a temporary venue for their 2019 season. After considering two suburban venues, ShoWare Center in Kent and Angel of the Winds Arena in Everett, the team announced in August 2018 that its primary home in 2019 would be in the city of Seattle at the University of Washington's Alaska Airlines Arena. While the arena was the Storm's primary home during the renovation, there was no guarantee of its availability for Storm playoff games, and some home games were planned to be played at other venues in the region, such as Tacoma Dome, if necessary. Since Washington's arena lacks air conditioning, and the WNBA requires that all games be played in air-conditioned venues, portable air conditioning units were used during Storm games. The team later announced that five of its 17 regular-season home games in 2019, including the home opener, would be at Angel of the Winds Arena. The 2020 season saw the Storm play their games in Bradenton, FL.

Amazon Prime Video deal
In 2022, Amazon Prime Video announced a landmark new deal with the Seattle Storm, becoming the official streaming service of the Storm, and one of the first streamers to hold local broadcast rights with a WNBA team. Approximately 30 Storm games will be available to Prime Video customers throughout Washington state.

Season-by-season records

Players

Current roster

Former players

Retired numbers

Coaches and staff

Owners

Barry and Ginger Ackerley, owners of the Seattle SuperSonics (2000–2001)
Howard Schultz, owner of the Seattle SuperSonics (2001–2006) 
Clay Bennett, owner of the Seattle SuperSonics (2007) 
Force 10 Hoops LLC, composed of Dawn Trudeau, Lisa Brummel, Ginny Gilder (2008–present)

Head coaches

General managers
Lin Dunn (2000–2002)
Billy McKinney (2002–2003)
Karen Bryant (2004–2010)
Brian Agler (2011–2014)
Alisha Valavanis (2015–2021)
Talisa Rhea (2021–present)

Assistant Coaches
 Kathy Anderson (2000–2001)
 Missy Bequette (2000–2001)
 Carrie Graf (2002)
 Gary Kloppenburg (2002; 2017-2019, 2021)
 Jenny Boucek (2003–2005, 2011)
 Jessie Kenlaw (2003–2006)
 Heidi VanDerveer (2006–2007)
 Shelley Patterson (2007–2009)
 Nancy Darsch (2008–2013)
 Shaquala Williams (2014)
 Rob Fodor (2015)
 Ryan Webb (2015–2017; 2021)
 Leah Drury (2016)
 Crystal Robinson (2018)
 Noelle Quinn (2019-2020)
 Perry Huang (2021–Present)
 Pokey Chatman (2022–Present)
 Ebony Hoffman (2022–Present)

Records and statistics

Season records

Regular season attendance
 A sellout for a basketball game at Climate Pledge Arena is 18,100. For Storm games, reaching capacity of the lower bowl (13,500) is considered a sellout.
 A sellout for a basketball game at the team's main home during the renovation of Climate Pledge Arena, Alaska Airlines Arena, is 10,000. A sellout at the team's secondary home, Angel of the Winds Arena, is 8,500.

All-Stars
2000: None
2001: Lauren Jackson
2002: Sue Bird, Lauren Jackson
2003: Sue Bird, Lauren Jackson
2004: Sue Bird
2005: Sue Bird, Lauren Jackson
2006: Sue Bird, Lauren Jackson
2007: Sue Bird, Lauren Jackson
2008: No All-Star Game
2009: Sue Bird, Swin Cash, Lauren Jackson
2010: Sue Bird, Swin Cash, Lauren Jackson
2011: Sue Bird, Swin Cash
2012: No All-Star Game
2013: Tina Thompson
2014: Sue Bird
2015: Sue Bird
2016: No All-Star Game
2017: Sue Bird, Breanna Stewart
2018: Sue Bird, Jewell Loyd, Breanna Stewart
2019: Jewell Loyd, Natasha Howard
2020: No All-Star Game
2021: Sue Bird, Jewell Loyd, Breanna Stewart
2022: Sue Bird, Jewell Loyd, Breanna Stewart

Olympians
2004: Sue Bird, Lauren Jackson (AUS)
2008: Sue Bird, Lauren Jackson (AUS), Kelly Santos (BRA)
2012: Sue Bird, Lauren Jackson (AUS)
2016: Sue Bird, Breanna Stewart, Ramu Tokashiki (JPN)
2020: Sue Bird, Jewell Loyd, Breanna Stewart, Stephanie Talbot (AUS), Ezi Magbegor (AUS)

Honors and awards

2002 All-WNBA First Team: Sue Bird
2003 Most Valuable Player: Lauren Jackson
2003 Peak Performer (Scoring): Lauren Jackson
2003 All-WNBA First Team: Sue Bird
2003 All-WNBA First Team: Lauren Jackson
2004 Finals MVP: Betty Lennox
2004 Peak Performer (Scoring): Lauren Jackson
2004 All-WNBA First Team: Sue Bird
2004 All-WNBA First Team: Lauren Jackson
2005 All-WNBA First Team: Sue Bird
2005 All-WNBA First Team: Lauren Jackson
2005 All-Defensive Second Team: Lauren Jackson
2006 All-Decade Team: Sue Bird
2006 All-Decade Team: Lauren Jackson
2006 All-WNBA First Team: Lauren Jackson
2007 Most Valuable Player: Lauren Jackson
2007 Defensive Player of the Year: Lauren Jackson
2007 Peak Performer (Scoring): Lauren Jackson
2007 Peak Performer (Rebounds): Lauren Jackson
2007 All-WNBA First Team: Lauren Jackson
2007 All-Defensive First Team: Lauren Jackson
2008 All-WNBA Second Team: Sue Bird
2008 All-WNBA Second Team: Lauren Jackson
2008 All-Defensive Second Team: Lauren Jackson
2009 All-Star Game MVP: Swin Cash
2009 Peak Performer (Assists): Sue Bird
2009 All-WNBA First Team: Lauren Jackson
2009 All-Defensive First Team: Lauren Jackson
2009 All-Defensive First Team: Tanisha Wright
2010 Most Valuable Player: Lauren Jackson
2010 Finals MVP: Lauren Jackson
2010 Coach of the Year: Brian Agler
2010 All-WNBA First Team: Lauren Jackson
2010 All-WNBA Second Team: Sue Bird
2010 All-Defensive First Team: Tanisha Wright
2010 All-Defensive Second Team: Lauren Jackson
2011 All-Star Game MVP: Swin Cash
2011 Kim Perrot Sportsmanship Award: Sue Bird
2011 All-WNBA Second Team: Sue Bird
2011 All-Defensive First Team: Tanisha Wright
2011 All-Defensive Second Team: Swin Cash
2013 All-Defensive First Team: Tanisha Wright
2015 July Rookie of the Month: Jewell Loyd
2015 Rookie of the Year: Jewell Loyd
2015 All-Rookie Team: Jewell Loyd
2015 All-Rookie Team: Ramu Tokashiki
2016 Rookie of the Year: Breanna Stewart
2016 Peak Performer (Assists): Sue Bird
2016 All-Defensive Second Team: Breanna Stewart
2016 All-Rookie Team: Breanna Stewart
2017 Kim Perrot Sportsmanship Award: Sue Bird
2018 Most Valuable Player: Breanna Stewart
2018 Most Improved Player: Natasha Howard
2018 Kim Perrot Sportsmanship Award: Sue Bird
2018 Finals MVP: Breanna Stewart
2018 All-WNBA First Team: Breanna Stewart
2018 All-Defensive First Team: Natasha Howard
2019 Defensive Player of the Year: Natasha Howard
2019 All-WNBA First Team: Natasha Howard
2019 All-Defensive First Team: Jordin Canada
2019 All-Defensive Second Team: Alysha Clark
2020 Finals MVP: Breanna Stewart
2020 All-WNBA First Team: Breanna Stewart
2020 All-Defensive First Team: Alysha Clark
2020 All-Defensive Second Team: Breanna Stewart
2021 Commissioner's Cup MVP: Breanna Stewart
2021 All-Defensive Second Team: Breanna Stewart
2021 All-WNBA First Team: Jewell Loyd
2021 All-WNBA First Team: Breanna Stewart
2022 All-WNBA First Team: Breanna Stewart
2022 Peak Performer: Points: Breanna Stewart
2022 All-Defensive First Team: Breanna Stewart
2022 All-Defensive Second Team: Gabby Williams
2022 All-Defensive Second Team: Ezi Magbegor

Media coverage
Currently, most Storm home games are broadcast on Amazon Prime. Broadcasters for the Storm games are Dick Fain and Elise Woodward.

All games  are broadcast to the WNBA LiveAccess game feeds on the league website. Furthermore, some Storm games are broadcast nationally on ESPN, ESPN2, CBS, CBS Sports Network and ABC. The WNBA has reached an eight-year agreement with ESPN, which will pay rights fees to the Storm, as well as other teams in the league.

Notes

References

External links

 

 
Women's National Basketball Association teams
Sports in Seattle
Basketball teams established in 2000
Basketball teams in Washington (state)